Pierre Jaquet-Droz (1721–1790) was a watchmaker of the late eighteenth century. He was born on 28 July 1721 in La Chaux-de-Fonds, in the Principality of Neuchâtel, which was then part of the Kingdom of Prussia. He lived in Paris, London, and Geneva, where he designed and built animated dolls known as automata to help his firm sell watches and mechanical caged songbirds.

Notable works
Constructed between 1768 and 1774 by Pierre Jaquet-Droz, his son Henri-Louis (1752-1791), and Jean-Frédéric Leschot (1746-1824), the automata include The Writer (made of 6000 pieces), The Musician (2500 pieces), and The Draughtsman (2000 pieces).

His astonishing mechanisms fascinated the kings and emperors of Europe, China, India and Japan.

Some consider these devices to be the oldest examples of the computer. The Writer, a mechanical boy who writes with a quill pen upon paper with real ink, has an input device to set tabs, defining individual letters written by the boy, that form a programmable memory. It has 40 cams that represent the read-only program. The work of Pierre Jaquet-Droz predates that of Charles Babbage by decades.

The automata of Jaquet-Droz are considered to be some of the finest examples of human mechanical problem solving. Three particularly complex and still functional dolls, now known as the Jaquet-Droz automata, are housed at the Musée d'Art et d'Histoire (art and history museum) in Neuchâtel, Switzerland.

He once constructed a clock that was capable of the following surprising movements:There were seen on it a negro, a dog, and a shepherd; when the clock struck, the shepherd played six tunes on his flute, and the dog approached and fawned upon him. This clock was exhibited to the King of Spain, who was delighted with it. "The gentleness of my dog," said Droz, "is his least merit; if your Majesty touch one of the apples, which you see in the shepherd's basket, you will admire the fidelity of this animal." The King took an apple, and the dog flew at his hand, and barked so loud, that the King's dog, which was in the room, began also to bark; at this the Courtiers, not doubting that it was an affair of witchcraft, hastily left the room, crossing themselves as they went out. The minister of Marine was the only one that ventured to stay. The king having desired him to ask the negro what o'clock it was, the minister obeyed, but he obtained no reply. Droz then observed, that the negro had not yet learned Spanish.

Bibliography 

Perregaux, Charles, Les Jaquet-Droz et leurs automates, Neuchâtel, 1906
Perregaux, Charles et Perrot, François-Louis, Les Jaquet-Droz et Leschot, Neuchâtel, 1916
Chapuis, Alfred et Gélis, Edouard, Le monde des automates, Paris, 1928
Chapuis, Alfred et Droz, Edmond, Les automates, figures artificielles d'hommes et d'animaux, Neuchâtel, 1949
Maingot, Eliane, Les automates, Paris, 1959
Carrera, Roland, Loiseau, Dominique et Olivier Roux, Androïdes. Les automates Jaquet-Droz, Lausanne, 1979
Beaune, Jean-Claude, L'automate et ses mobiles, Paris, 1980
Tissot, André, Voyage de Pierre Jaquet-Droz à la Cour du Roi d'Espagne 1758-1759, Neuchâtel, 1982
Beyer, Annette, Faszinierende Welt der Automaten, Munich, 1983
Collectif, The Cyborg Handbook, London, 1995
Vanden Berghe, Marc, Henri-Louis Jaquet-Droz et Pierre Jaquet-Droz in Biographies Neuchâteloises, tome I, *Hauterive, Attinger, 1996
Collectif, Die Androïden: zur Poetologie des Automaten, Bern, Peter Lang, 1996 (contributions in German en French. English summaries)

See also
The Swatch Group, current maker of Jaquet Droz luxury watches
Maillardet's automaton
Android
Humanoid robot
Singing bird box

References

External links
Pierre Jaquet-Droz, in the Historical Dictionary of Switzerland

Montres Jaquet-Droz
 Story of the Jaquet-Droz androids, virtual museum and DVD
 Jaquet-Droz

__notoc__

1721 births
1790 deaths
German watchmakers (people)
People from La Chaux-de-Fonds
People from Le Locle